Luis Solana Madariaga (born 18 December 1935) is a Spanish businessman and politician.

Biography 
Born on 18 December 1935 in Madrid, he is an older brother of Javier Solana. He graduated in law at the Complutense University of Madrid, and later studied economics in London and Paris.

He married , best known as 'Cuca Solana', pioneer of fashion in Spain and founder of the Pasarela Cibeles.

A member of the Spanish Socialist Workers' Party (PSOE), he was elected member of the Congress of Deputies in the 1977 general election in representation of Segovia. He was re-elected in the 1979 and 1982 general elections. In 1985 he became a member of the Spanish group of the Trilateral Commission.

He was the chairman of Telefónica from 1982 to 1989, when he was appointed as Director-General of RTVE. He later became chairman of Inversiones Graminsa, S.A (1991) and member of the board of directors of Amper (2004).

He was widowed in 2019.

References 

1935 births
Members of the constituent Congress of Deputies (Spain)
Members of the 1st Congress of Deputies (Spain)
Members of the 2nd Congress of Deputies (Spain)
Living people
Politicians from Madrid
Spanish Socialist Workers' Party politicians
Complutense University of Madrid alumni
Spanish mass media owners